Aniba robusta is a species of plant in the family Lauraceae. It is endemic to Venezuela.

References

Flora of Venezuela
robusta
Least concern plants
Taxonomy articles created by Polbot